James O'Connor is an American politician, elected to the Arizona Corporation Commission in 2020.

Before entering politics, O'Connor worked for 42 years in the securities industry, owning his own firm, Nexus Financial Services. In 1994, O'Connor served as an advisor to the California Senate on rules to govern state investment pools.

Electoral history
 2018 O'Connor ran for the Corporation Commission, losing the Republican primary to Justin Olson and Rodney Glassman.
 2020 After Boyd Dunn failed to receive enough petition signatures to run for reelection to the commission, O'Connor launched a write-in campaign, receiving enough votes in the primary to secure a spot on the ballot in the general election. O'Connor, along with Republican incumbent Lea Márquez Peterson and Democrat Anna Tovar were elected to the commission.

In the news
As reported by Business Insider on May 10, 2021,  [a]n Arizona GOP official made unverified claims that COVID vaccine turns people into 'potted plants'. Commissioner Jim O'Connor parroted the unverified claims of an Idaho doctor, and told the Arizona Republic that "many people who have taken the shot, many thousands of people here in the US, are deceased. And the deceased part is the good news. And please don't take that out of context."

References

External links
 Ballotpedia

1946 births
Arizona Republicans
Candidates in the 2018 United States elections
Living people